Archery was contested at the 2011 Parapan American Games from November 15 to 17 at the Pan American Archery Stadium in Guadalajara, Mexico.

Medal summary

Medal table

Medal events

External links
2011 Parapan American Games – Archery

Events at the 2011 Parapan American Games
2011 in archery
International archery competitions hosted by Mexico